Joseph Charles Léonard Yvon Beaulne (1919–1999) was a Canadian diplomat. He was Ambassador Extraordinary and Plenipotentiary to Venezuela, the Dominican Republic and Brazil. He then became the Ambassador and Permanent Representative to the United Nations in New York and shortly thereafter to UNESCO and then to the papal Holy See.

He was awarded The Order of Canada in 1992 for his contribution "to the promotion of human rights and freedoms, particularly through the creation of the Human Rights Research and Education Centre at the University of Ottawa and his considerable work with the United Nations Human Rights Commission."

References

External links 
 Foreign Affairs and International Trade Canada Complete List of Posts 

1919 births
1999 deaths
Permanent Representatives of Canada to the United Nations
Permanent Delegates of Canada to UNESCO
Ambassadors of Canada to the Holy See
Ambassadors of Canada to Venezuela
Ambassadors of Canada to the Dominican Republic
Ambassadors of Canada to Brazil
Members of the Order of Canada
Canadian expatriates in the United States